Kenneth Dean Burke (born September 7, 1957) is a Republican member of the Georgia State Senate in the 152nd Georgia General Assembly from Bainbridge, Georgia. Burke was first elected Senator in the 2012 general election, and serves Georgia's 11th district—a constituency which includes Colquitt, Decatur, Early, Grady, Miller, and Seminole counties—with portions of Mitchell and Thomas counties as well.

Early life and education
Dean Burke graduated summa cum laude from Georgia Southwestern State University—going on to graduate from the Medical College of Georgia. He then trained in specialized medicine at Mercer University's School of Medicine. Burke is board certified and has been a practicing physician in Georgia for the past 28 years.

Political career
Senator Burke was elected in 2012 and sworn into the Senate in 2013. He sits on the Senate Agriculture and Consumer Affairs, Education and Youth, Health and Human Services, and Retirement committees.

Committee assignments
Senate Committee, seats heldAgriculture and Consumer Affairs, member   Education and Youth, member  Health and Human Services, member  Retirement, vice chairman

See also

 List of state government committees (Georgia)

References

External links
 Welcome to the Georgia General Assembly  Legis.ga.gov. Retrieved June 28, 2013.

Republican Party Georgia (U.S. state) state senators
Georgia Regents University alumni
Georgia Southwestern State University alumni
Living people
Mercer University alumni
People from Bainbridge, Georgia
21st-century American politicians
1957 births